Federico Canuti (born 30 August 1985) is an Italian former professional road bicycle racer, who rode professionally between 2008 and 2013 for the  and  teams, and in 2017 for the  team.

Canuti was named a member of the  team for the 2012 Tour de France, making his début in the race.

After retiring from professional cycling, Canuti set up a cycling apparel brand, Kaiser KR Clothing.

Major results

2006
1st Giro Valli Aretine
2007
1st GP Due Paesi in Festa
1st Trofeo Pedalata Elettrica
1st Stage 4 Giro della Toscana
2nd GP Pretola
2nd Trofeo Società Ciclistica Corsanico
2nd Trofeo Velo Club Seano
2nd La Ciociarissima
2nd Trofeo Alta Valle del Tevere
3rd Overall Giro delle Valli Cuneesi nelle Alpi del Mare
4th Coppa Città di Rosà
4th Due Giorni Marchigiana
4th Firenze–Viareggio
5th Coppa Comune di Castelfranco
5th Firenze–Empoli
2009
2nd Hel van het Mergelland
7th Giro della Romagna
2010
4th Overall Giro della Provincia di Reggio Calabria
6th Hel van het Mergelland
2011
2nd Hel van het Mergelland
6th GP Industria & Artigianato di Larciano
7th Tre Valli Varesine
8th Trofeo Matteotti
8th Gran Premio Città di Camaiore
9th Overall Giro della Provincia di Reggio Calabria

Grand Tour general classification results timeline

References

External links

Cycling News profile

1985 births
Living people
Italian male cyclists
People from Pesaro
Cyclists from Marche
Sportspeople from the Province of Pesaro and Urbino